The Cardiel Formation is a Maastrichtian geologic formation of the Austral Basin in Santa Cruz Province, Argentina. The formation comprises sandstones and conglomerates with abundant tuff beds. The formation is overlain by the Slogget and San Julián Formations and overlies the Divisadero and Kachaike Formations. Dinosaur remains diagnostic to the genus level are among the fossils that have been recovered from the formation.

Paleofauna 
 Clasmodosaurus spatula - Teeth - (sauropod indet)
 "Loncosaurus argentinus" (ornithopod indet.) - Femur. This genus may have also been found in the Matasiete Formation.

See also 
 List of dinosaur-bearing rock formations
 List of stratigraphic units with few dinosaur genera
 Allen Formation

References

Bibliography

Further reading 
 J. E. Powell. 2003. Revision of South American titanosaurid dinosaurs: palaeobiological, palaeobiogeographical and phylogenetic aspects. Records of the Queen Victoria Museum Launceston 111:1-173

Geologic formations of Argentina
Cretaceous Argentina
Maastrichtian Stage of South America
Sandstone formations
Conglomerate formations
Tuff formations
Formations
Fossiliferous stratigraphic units of South America
Paleontology in Argentina
Geology of Santa Cruz Province, Argentina